The Bombardier Challenger 800 is the largest super-midsize business jet that was built by Bombardier Aerospace. It is based on Bombardier's 50-seat Bombardier CRJ200 LR. The Challenger 850 is the updated version, produced from 2006 to 2012.

Design and development

The Challenger 850 is derived from the Bombardier CRJ200 airliner. It is capable of accommodating 12–16 passengers. The Challenger 850 jet has a transcontinental range and a high-speed cruise of Mach 0.80.

The Challenger 850 was first manufactured in 1996 as the Challenger SE (Special Edition) and rebranded in 2006 as the Challenger 850. Production ended in 2012 following completion of 71 deliveries.

Specifications

See also

References

External links

 Bombardier Challenger 850 homepage
 Bombardier launches corporate shuttles from Aviation

Challenger 850
1990s Canadian business aircraft
Twinjets
T-tail aircraft
Aircraft first flown in 2006